The Ministry of Culture, Sport  and Youth of Georgia (sakartvelos kulturisa da sportis saministro) is a governmental agency within the Cabinet of Georgia. It is in charge of regulating activities related to preservation of Georgian culture and its cultural monuments as well as activities related to sports and youth development.

History
The ministry was established in 2010 as a result of restructuring activities within the Georgian government in June 2010. The preceding Ministry of Culture, Monuments Protection and Sports was split into two separate government agencies: Ministry of Sport and Youth Affairs and Ministry of Culture and Monument Protection. The agency was merged with the Ministry of Education and Science in July 2018.The Ministry of Culture, Sport and Youth was separated from the Ministry of Education and Science and reestablished as a standalone agency in 2021, by the decree of the prime minister.

Structure
The ministry is headed by the minister aided by the first deputy minister in charge of Cultural Heritage Strategy, Organizations Coordination and Permissions, and International Programs and Georgian Culture Popularization departments; and three deputies in charge of Administrative, Events and Regional Coordination and Legal departments.
Parliament exercises control over the ministry's activities. The budget of the ministry in 2010 was GEL 54,977,500 roughly equal to € 21,991,000.

Ministers after 2004
Giorgi Gabashvili, February 2004–January 2008
Nikoloz Vacheishvili, January 2008–November 2008
Grigol Vashadze, November 2008–December 2008
Nikoloz Rurua, December 2008–October 2012
Guram Odisharia, October 2012–Present

See also
Cabinet of Georgia
List of monuments in Georgia

References

Culture and Monument Protection
Georgia
2010 establishments in Georgia (country)
Ministries established in 2010
Government agencies established in 2010
Georgia, Culture and Sports
2018 disestablishments in Georgia (country)